George Neville Watson   (31 January 1886 – 2 February 1965) was an English mathematician, who applied complex analysis to the theory of special functions. His collaboration on the 1915 second edition of E. T. Whittaker's A Course of Modern Analysis (1902) produced the classic "Whittaker and Watson" text. In 1918 he proved a significant result known as Watson's lemma, that has many applications in the theory on the asymptotic behaviour of exponential integrals.

Life
He was born in Westward Ho! in Devon the son of George Wentworth Watson, a schoolmaster and genealogist, and his wife, Mary Justina Griffith.

He was educated at St Paul's School in London, as a pupil of F. S. Macaulay. He then studied Mathematics at Trinity College, Cambridge. There he encountered E. T. Whittaker, though their overlap was only two years.

From 1914 to 1918 he lectured in Mathematics at University College, London. He became Professor of Pure Mathematics at the University of Birmingham in 1918, replacing Prof R S Heath, and remained in this role until 1951.

He was awarded an honorary MSc Pure Science in 1919 by Birmingham University.

He was President of the London Mathematical Society 1933/35.

He died at Leamington Spa on 2 February 1965.

Works
His Treatise on the theory of Bessel functions (1922) also became a classic, in particular in regard to the asymptotic expansions of Bessel functions.

He subsequently spent many years on Ramanujan's formulae in the area of modular equations, mock theta functions and q-series, and for some time looked after Ramanujan's lost notebook.

Ramanujan discovered many more modular equations than all of his mathematical predecessors combined. Watson provided proofs for most of Ramanujan's modular equations. Bruce C. Berndt completed the project begun by Watson and Wilson. Much of Berndt's book Ramanujan's Notebooks, Part 3 (1998) is based upon the prior work of Watson.

Watson's interests included solvable cases of the quintic equation. He introduced Watson's quintuple product identity.

Honours and awards
In 1919 Watson was elected a Fellow of the Royal Society, and in 1946, he received the Sylvester Medal from the Society. He was president of the London Mathematical Society from 1933 to 1935.

He is sometimes confused with the mathematician G. L. Watson, who worked on quadratic forms, and G. Watson, a statistician.

Family

In 1925 he married Elfrida Gwenfil Lane daughter of Thomas Wright Lane.

References 

1886 births
1965 deaths
People from Bideford
20th-century English mathematicians
Mathematical analysts
People educated at St Paul's School, London
Academics of the University of Birmingham
Senior Wranglers
Fellows of the Royal Society
De Morgan Medallists
Alumni of Trinity College, Cambridge